Makkena Mallikarjuna Rao served as the Member of the Legislative Assembly for Vinukonda constituency in Andhra Pradesh, India, between 2004 and 2009. He represented the Indian National Congress. He first worked as sarpanch for Gonuguntlavaripalem Mandal, then ran for MLA in 2004 and won the election. He formed the Rajiv Foundation which helps poor people. He improved many agricultural activities and built many wells for the farmers.

He was elected as DCC President (Indian National Congress).

For the development of the state and for the people he joined YSR Congress party in the year 2019.

References

Andhra Pradesh MLAs 2004–2009
Indian National Congress politicians from Andhra Pradesh
Living people
Year of birth missing (living people)